Ewen Mackenzie Stewart Ferguson (born 6 July 1996) is a Scottish professional golfer.

Amateur career
During his amateur career, Ferguson won the Boys Amateur Championship in 2013, and is the only player to hold the British Boys title and both the Scottish Boys Matchplay and Strokeplay titles simultaneously. Ferguson was a member of the 2015 Walker Cup Great Britain and Ireland team. In August 2016, he reached the quarter-finals of The Amateur Championship.

Professional career
Ferguson turned professional in August 2016.

In November 2017, Ferguson made the final stage of the European Tour Q-school and finished in 76th place. He then competed full-time on the Challenge Tour in 2018 and 2019, with a best finish of runner-up at the Euram Bank Open in 2019 and finished 25th in the 2019 Road to Mallorca Challenge Tour rankings. In 2019 he had a best finish on the European Tour of third place in the Belgian Knockout. Covid hit before the start of the 2020 Challenge Tour season and so with a freeze on demotions and promotions from the Challenge Tour and European Tour, Ferguson took advantage of his category and nearly managed to play a full European Tour schedule. Returning to the Challenge Tour in 2021 he was a runner-up three times and had three other top-10 finishes, he finished 8th in the Road to Mallorca Challenge Tour rankings, securing his full European Tour card for the first time.

In March 2022, in only his 37th start, Ferguson claimed his first European Tour victory at the Commercial Bank Qatar Masters. 

Ferguson won his second European Tour event in August 2022 at the ISPS Handa World Invitational. He shot an opening-round 61 to eventually win wire-to-wire. A month later, he finished second at the Made in HimmerLand in Denmark; one shot behind Oliver Wilson.

Amateur wins
2012 Challenge at Fleming Island, Munster Boys Amateur
2013 Stephen Gallagher Foundation Trophy, Boys Amateur Championship
2014 Scottish Boys Championship, Scottish Boys Strokeplay
2015 Scottish Champion of Champions, Craigmillar Park Open

Source:

Professional wins (2)

European Tour wins (2)

Playoff record
Challenge Tour playoff record (0–1)

Team appearances
Amateur
Boys Home Internationals (representing Scotland): 2012, 2013, 2014
European Boys' Team Championship (representing Scotland): 2013, 2014
Jacques Léglise Trophy (representing Great Britain & Ireland): 2013 (winners), 2014 (captain, winners)
European Amateur Team Championship (representing Scotland): 2015 (winners)
Walker Cup (representing Great Britain & Ireland): 2015 (winners)

Professional
Hero Cup (representing Great Britain & Ireland): 2023

See also
2021 Challenge Tour graduates

References

External links 

Scottish male golfers
European Tour golfers
Golfers from Glasgow
1996 births
Living people